The Canada China Business Council or CCBC (French: Conseil d'affaires Canada-Chine, Chinese: 加中贸易理事会) is a private, non-profit business association founded in 1978 to facilitate and promote business, trade and investment between Canada and People's Republic of China. CCBC has offices in Toronto, Vancouver, Montreal, Calgary, Halifax, Beijing, and Shanghai.  CCBC is the de facto Canadian chamber of commerce in Beijing. It also has business incubators in Beijing, Shanghai, Montreal, and Calgary to help Canadian companies grow in China, and Chinese investors to succeed in Canada.

Mandate
Stimulate growth in bilateral business, trade and investment in goods and services;
Promote closer bilateral relations between Canada and China;
Provide practical and focused business advice and services to members;
Be the voice of the Canadian business community on matters pertaining Canada-China relations at all levels of government and to the general public in both countries.

Events

CCBC hosts various events such as trade missions and delegations, conferences, roundtables and seminars throughout the year. It also organizes business and networking events on behalf of its members. Notable past events include the state visit to China by Governor General David Johnston in 2013, visit by Prime Minister Stephen Harper in 2012, and China's Commerce Minister CHEN Deming's  visit to Canada in 2012. Other events include:

CCBC Annual General Meeting and Policy Conference
Canada-China Business Forum 
CCBC China Business Workshops
CCBC Great Canadian Christmas Party
CCBC Canadian Charity Ball
Canada Day celebrations

Publications

CCBC publishes its annual magazine, the Canada-China Business Forum Magazine". The magazine covers topics relevant to Canada-China business, trade and investment. Business leaders, public officials and academics familiar with Canada-China relations contribute to the magazine. The most recent edition was published in August 2016.

Advocacy and awards

CCBC advocates for stronger bilateral ties between Canada and China and for a better business environment in each country. This advocacy work is directed by members towards governments and institutions in both countries. The Government of Alberta signed an externship agreement with the CCBC in 2012 to allow young Albertans to gain valuable work experience in China. CCBC also recognizes companies that have demonstrated business excellence and leadership in China and Canada. In 2012, the CCBC presented its biennial China-Canada Business Excellence Awards to:

Hatch for CCBC Member of the Year 
Epic Data International for Outstanding SME
Huawei for Investment in Canada 
Ivey Business School for Education Excellence

Structure
The CCBC is a private, non-partisan, membership-based business association, with members from both Canada and China. Members include large multinational corporations such as Barrick Gold, BlackBerry, Bombardier, BMO Financial Group, Caisse de Depot, CITIC, Export Development Canada, Huawei Technologies, Manulife Financial, Molycorp, Power Corporation, SNC Lavalin, and  Sun Life Financial. The CCBC draws its members from different industries, including manufacturing, oil and gas, education, public sector and professional services. The CCBC works closely with the China Council for Promotion of International Trade(CCPIT).

References

1978 establishments in Canada
Business organizations based in Canada
Canada–China relations